Asunción is a Spanish word that means ascension or assumption. In most cases the name refers to the Assumption of Mary.

Asunción may refer to:

Places
Costa Rica
 La Asunción District, in Belén Canton, Heredia province, Costa Rica
Guatemala
Asunción Mita, a municipality in the Jutiapa department of Guatemala
La Nueva Guatemala de la Asunción, the formal name of Guatemala City, Guatemala
Mexico
Asunción Cacalotepec, a town and municipality in Oaxaca, Mexico
Asunción Cuyotepeji, a town and municipality in Oaxaca, Mexico
Asunción Ixtaltepec, a town and municipality in Oaxaca, Mexico
Asunción Nochixtlán, a town and municipality in Oaxaca, Mexico
Asunción Ocotlán, a town and municipality in Oaxaca, Mexico
Asunción Tlacolulita, a town and municipality in Oaxaca, Mexico
Paraguay
Asunción, the capital city of Paraguay
Gran Asunción, the metropolitan area of the city of Asunción, Paraguay
Peru
Asunción District, Chachapoyas, in Chachapoyas province, Amazonas region, Peru
Asunción Province, a province of the Ancash Region in Peru
Philippines
Asuncion, Davao del Norte, a municipality in the province of Davao del Norte, Philippines
United States
Asuncion, California, an unincorporated area in the United States
Asuncion Island, one of the Northern Mariana Islands
Venezuela
La Asunción, a city in Nueva Esparta state of Venezuela

People
Al Asuncion (1929–2006), Filipino boxer
José Asunción Flores (1904–1972), Paraguayan composer
José Asunción Silva (1865–1896), Colombian poet
María Asunción Aramburuzabala (1963—), the wealthiest woman in Mexico

Other
Asunción Paraguay Temple, a Mormon temple in Asunción
Estadio La Asunción, a stadium in Asunción Mita, Guatemala
First Synod of Asunción, a synod of the Roman Catholic Church of the Diocese of Paraguay in 1603
Nuestra Señora de la Asunción de Zia, a Spanish Mission in the area that is now New Mexico, USA; established 1706
Olimpia Asunción, a traditional Paraguayan sports club based in Asunción
Treaty of Asunción, a 1991 economic treaty among Argentina, Brazil, Paraguay, and Uruguay